Protected appointments system for hereditary privileges in asia to select candidates for state bureaucracy based on their families historically existed in countries that were part of the East Asian cultural sphere, and the concept originated in China.The system was one of the systems to select candidates for state bureaucracies besides imperial examinations.

Local varieties

China
The yinbuzhi(蔭補制) existed in the Tang dynasty and Song dynasty.

Korea
Eumseo(음서,蔭敍) was a system of the Goryeo dynasty that determined the suitability of the candidate based on their family backgrounds.There were four attested types of Eumseo found in records.

Japan
On-i(蔭位) was such a system for Japan that was adopted following the adoption of the Taihō Code in  701, and was allowed for Royal descendants and descendants of offices higher up.

Ryukyu
Ryukyu's kage(蔭) is mentioned as one of the political positions in Ryukyu who wore attire appropriate for 8th class subordinates(八品) .

Vietnam

References

East Asian culture